Paul Lawrence Adderley (August 15, 1928 – September 18, 2012) was a Bahamian politician and lawyer. He was the longest serving Attorney General of the 20th century, holding the post for 17 years.

Career

Adderley was originally a member of the Progressive Liberal Party (PLP) under Lynden Oscar Pindling. However, Adderley left the PLP in 1965 and established the National Development Party (NDP) political party. He returned to the PLP shortly before the Bahamas achieved independence from the United Kingdom in 1973.

On 1 March 1973, he was appointed Minister of External Affairs and on July 10, 1973 became the country's first and, ultimately, longest-serving Attorney-General. Adderley served as the Minister of Finance from 1990 to 1992.

Adderley served as acting Governor-General of the Bahamas from December 1, 2005 until February 1, 2006.

Adderley retired from politics, remaining an active attorney as of 2010. In September 2010, he appeared in the documentary film On the Wings of Men, about Lynden Oscar Pindling by Bahamian filmmaker Calvin Harris.

Death and legacy
Adderley died on September 19, 2012, aged 84, and was given a state funeral on September 28.

At a ceremony on June 27, 2014, the building housing the Office of the Attorney General (OAG) and the Ministry of Legal Affairs was named in honour of Paul L. Adderley.

References

Governors-General of the Bahamas
Progressive Liberal Party politicians
1928 births
2012 deaths
National Development Party (Bahamas) politicians
Attorneys General of the Bahamas
Finance ministers of the Bahamas
20th-century Bahamian lawyers
21st-century Bahamian lawyers